Giuseppe Materazzi (born 5 January 1946 in Arborea, Province of Oristano) is an Italian football manager and former player, who played as a midfielder.

Playing career 
Sardinian-born Materazzi is best remember as one of the most representative players for U.S. Lecce, where he spent seven years and played 228 Serie C matches. He also played for Tempio, Reggina and Bari.

Managing career 
Materazzi started his coaching career in 1979, for Tuscan Serie C2 team Cerretese. He first coached Serie A team, Pisa SC, in 1987/1988, leading the side to a 13th-place finish. He then coached Lazio for two seasons, before to move to Serie B side Messina in 1990. His longest period as football coach started in 1992 in Bari, where he already played in his past career and coached, but at the youth level. He stayed four years in Bari, two of them in Serie A. He then coached a number of minor Serie A and Serie B teams, such as Padova, Brescia, Piacenza, before being signed by Sporting Clube de Portugal in July 1999. However his experience lasted just a few months, as Materazzi was fired in September 1999 after a UEFA Cup loss to Viking F.K. On early November he was called by Venezia chairman Maurizio Zamparini to replace Luciano Spalletti at the helm of that Serie A team, but was fired just 27 days later, and notably replaced by Spalletti. His last club experience came in January 2001, as Materazzi was appointed to coach Cagliari of Serie A.

In 2003, Materazzi signed a three-year deal with Chinese club Tianjin Teda, but left after just one year. His name was recently mentioned regarding the head coaching position for the Costa Rica national team.

On 26 February 2007 Materazzi was appointed head coach of Serie B club Bari, replacing Rolando Maran. He led his club to a quiet escape from relegation, and was confirmed for the 2007–08 season. He resigned from his post on 27 December 2007, shortly after being defeated 4–0 at home by Lecce in the Apulian derby.

On 30 December 2008 Materazzi signed a contract to become the head coach of Olympiakos Volos, after just two months, Materazzi has decided to quit Volos on 6 March 2009. The Italian trainer has decided to resign because he has not reached the targets that he had fixed.

In July 2009 he was unveiled as new general manager of Spanish Tercera División side SE Eivissa-Ibiza, where he worked alongside new head coach Onofrio Barone, former Serie A player who also served as Materazzi's assistant in a number of clubs.

In 2010, he signed with Romanian club Braşov, but resigned after just 3 days.

In 2016 he briefly served as head coach of women's football team S.S. Lazio Women 2015.

Materazzi returned into football in 2018 with Serie C club Bisceglie, accepting an offer as the club's new technical area director, a role he left only a few days later due to economical disagreements with the board.

Personal life 
Giuseppe is the father of former Internazionale defender and Italian World Cup winner Marco Materazzi. His grandson Alessio Maestrelli made his professional debut in 2022.

References 

1946 births
Living people
People from the Province of Oristano
Footballers from Sardinia
S.S.C. Bari managers
S.S.C. Bari players
Brescia Calcio managers
Cagliari Calcio managers
A.C.R. Messina managers
Benevento Calcio managers
Association football midfielders
Italian football managers
Italian footballers
Piacenza Calcio 1919 managers
Reggina 1914 players
S.S. Lazio managers
Serie A managers
Serie C players
Sporting CP managers
U.S. Lecce players
Italian expatriate football managers
Expatriate football managers in Greece
Expatriate football managers in Portugal
Expatriate football managers in China
Italian expatriate sportspeople in Greece
Italian expatriate sportspeople in Portugal
Italian expatriate sportspeople in China